Sheelagh Blumberg (born November 27, 1978), known professionally as Shy Love and Shy Luv, is an American pornographic actress, of  Italian and Puerto Rican descent.  She has been active in the porn industry since 2003.

Early life
Love was raised in New Haven, Connecticut. She has stated that she is a certified public accountant and "holds a bachelor’s degree and two master’s degrees".

Personal life
In a 2007 interview with Gamelink, she said her relationship with her husband was only the third real relationship with a man she had ever had, and that she likes to play with other women.  She has two children.

Career
She is a part-owner of a nightclub in Colorado Springs called 13 Pure; it opened in January 2008.

Talent Agencies

Adult Talent Managers
In 2006 Love established her own talent agency, Adult Talent Managers, and signed Memphis Monroe and Lisa Daniels as contract girls. She has said that her agency's representation of gay men in addition to women is unique in the industry. In 2010, Love merged her company with another talent agency, A List Talent, to create a single agency with both adult and mainstream branches. Then in 2013, she sold her interest in the company.

Awards and nominations

References

External links

 
 
 
 Interview in RogReviews.com

1978 births
American pornographic film actresses
American people of Puerto Rican descent
American people of Italian descent
American women in business
Hispanic and Latino American pornographic film actors
Living people
Actresses from New Haven, Connecticut
Pornographic film actors from Connecticut
People from Connecticut